Bul-Kaypanovo (Bül-Qaypan) is a rural locality (a selo) and the administrative centre of Bul-Kaypanovsky Selsoviet, Tatyshlinsky District, Bashkortostan, Russia. The population was 682 as of 2010. There are 11 streets.

Geography 
Bul-Kaypanovo is located 7 km northwest of Verkhniye Tatyshly (the district's administrative centre) by road. Novokaypanovo is the nearest rural locality.

References 

Rural localities in Tatyshlinsky District